Thuwaybah (also Sobia) was a female Ṣaḥābah and the first foster-mother of the Islamic prophet Muḥammad.

Her name means "Deserving of God's reward". She is also known as Thuwaybah al-Islamiah.

Biography
She was the servant of 'Abd al-'Uzzā ibn 'Abd al-Muṭallib, better known as Abū Lahab. However she was freed by Abū Lahab when she informed him that his brother's ('Abdullāh's) wife Āminah had given birth to a son Muḥammad.

Thuwaybah became Muḥammad's first nurse, after his first three days with his mother, nursing both him and her own son Masrah. Thuwaybah also nursed Abu Salama, Muhammad's first cousin; as well as Hamza ibn Abd al-Muttalib, Muḥammad's paternal uncle, two years earlier: Muḥammad had said of Ḥamzah's daughter: "She is the daughter of my nursing brother."

Eventually, Ḥalīmah bint 'Abdullāh took over the task after a few days and nursed Muḥammad until he reached the age of weaning (around four years).

Thuwaybah became a Muslim when Muḥammad proclaimed prophethood. Her son died before her, and she herself died in 7 AH (629 CE).

See also
The Shaykh of the Ḥaram - Muḥammad al-'Alawi al-Mālikī in his Al-Dhakā'ir al-Muḥammadiyah writes that the Hadith Master (muḥaddith) Ibn Mundah records Thuwaybah among the Ṣaḥābah.

References

7th-century women
Women companions of the Prophet
629 deaths
Year of birth unknown